Dibenzyl sulfide is a symmetrical thioether. It contains two C6H5CH2- (benzyl) groups linked by a sulfide bridge.  It is a colorless or white solid that is soluble in nonpolar solvents.

Crystallography
The crystal structure of the solid is of the orthorhombic system with space group Pbcn; number 60. The unit cell dimensions are a=13.991 Å b=11.3985 Å c 7.2081 Å. The molecules in the gas take the same form as in the solid with a C2 symmetry.

Production
Benzyl sulfide is commercially manufactured by treating potassium sulfide with benzyl chloride, followed by distillation of the product.  It is also obtainable by desulfurization of dibenzyldisulfide with phosphine reagents.

References

Thioethers
Aromatic compounds